The 2010 WNBA season was the 14th season of the Women's National Basketball Association. The regular season began with a televised (ESPN2) meeting between the defending champion Phoenix Mercury and the Los Angeles Sparks in Phoenix, Arizona on May 15. The Connecticut Sun hosted the 10th Annual All-Star Game which was broadcast live on ESPN on July 10. This year, it was a contest between Geno Auriemma's USA Basketball team and a single team of WNBA All-Stars. The Finals was a series between the Seattle Storm and the Atlanta Dream which Seattle won 3–0.

2009/2010 WNBA offseason
The new television deal with ESPN continued during the 2010 season (runs 2009–2016). For the first time ever, teams will be paid rights fees as part of this deal.
As of the 2009 season, the maximum roster size per team was reduced from 13 to 11. Any team that falls below nine players able to play due to injury, pregnancy or any other factor outside of the control of the team will, upon request, be granted a roster hardship exception allowing the team to sign an additional player or players so that the team will have nine players able to play in an upcoming game or games. As soon as the injured (or otherwise sidelined) player(s) is able to play, the roster hardship player(s) – not any other player on the roster—must be waived.
On September 29, 2009, Nolan Richardson was named head coach and general manager of a potential Tulsa, Oklahoma franchise.
On October 20, 2009, the Detroit Shock announced that the franchise would relocate to Tulsa as well as move to the Western Conference.
On November 20, 2009, the Sacramento Monarchs folded.
On December 3, 2009, the New York Liberty announced that previously interim head coach Anne Donovan would be named head coach.
On December 8, 2009, Cheryl Reeve was named head coach of the Minnesota Lynx.
A dispersal draft was held on December 14, 2009, for all non-free agent Sacramento Monarchs players.
On January 7, 2010, the Los Angeles Sparks named former player Jennifer Gillom head coach.
On February 25, 2010, Sandy Brondello was named head coach of the San Antonio Silver Stars when Dan Hughes stepped aside from the position.

Transactions

Sacramento Monarchs dispersal draft
On December 14, 2009, the Sacramento Monarchs dispersal draft was held. Three former Monarchs players, Kara Lawson, Hamchetou Maiga-Ba and Ticha Penicheiro were free agents and therefore not eligible for this draft. Teams selected based inversely on their 2009 season finish.

The top picks were:
Nicole Powell, New York Liberty
Rebekkah Brunson, Minnesota Lynx
DeMya Walker, Connecticut Sun

Four of the twelve teams making selections waived their picks.

2010 WNBA Draft

The WNBA Draft lottery was held on November 5, 2009. The lottery teams were the Sacramento Monarchs, Minnesota Lynx (from N.Y.), Minnesota Lynx, Connecticut Sun and Chicago Sky. The top pick was awarded to Minnesota. Since Sacramento folded after the lottery, all the teams following Sacramento in the draft simply moved up a pick. Minnesota subsequently traded the first overall pick to Connecticut.

The 2010 WNBA Draft was held on April 8, 2010, in Secaucus, New Jersey. Coverage of the first round was shown on ESPN2 (HD). Second and third round coverage was shown on ESPNU and NBA TV.

The top picks were:
Tina Charles, Connecticut Sun
Monica Wright, Minnesota Lynx
Kelsey Griffin, Minnesota Lynx
Epiphanny Prince, Chicago Sky
Jayne Appel, San Antonio Silver Stars

Regular season

Standings

All-Star Game

The 2010 WNBA All-Star Game was hosted by the Connecticut Sun on July 10 at Mohegan Sun Arena. Coverage of the game began at 3:30pm on ESPN. This marks the third time the Sun have hosted the annual event. Unlike in previous years, this game was a contest between Geno Auriemma's USA basketball team and a team of WNBA all-stars.

Statistic leaders
The following shows the leaders for each statistic during the 2010 regular season.

Schedule

|-
| rowspan=2|Thu April 8 || 3:00 ||colspan=3| 2010 WNBA Draft: first round ||colspan=5| ESPN2 || Secaucus, New Jersey
|-
| 4:00 ||colspan=3| 2010 WNBA Draft: later rounds ||colspan=5| ESPNU, NBA TV || Secaucus, New Jersey 
|-
| rowspan=1|Fri April 30 || 1:00 || Chicago || @ || Minnesota ||  || 87–78CHI || Wright, Young (18) || Marginean (9) || Whitcomb (5) || Concordia University  633
|-
| rowspan=1|Sat May 1 || 10:00 || China || @ || Los Angeles ||  || 78–58LA || Junaid (15) || Mohammed (12) || Penicheiro (7) || Viejas Arena  3,874
|-
| rowspan=1|Sun May 2 || 4:00 || Phoenix || @ || Seattle ||  || 77–58SEA || Williams (19) || Paris (9) || Lacey (5) || KeyArena  4,912
|-
| rowspan=2|Tue May 4 || 11:00am || Atlanta || @ || Connecticut ||  || 86–79CON || Charles (21) || Charles (9) || Price (5) || Mohegan Sun Arena  3,779
|-
| 8:00 || China || @ || San Antonio ||  || 91–57SA || N/A || N/A || N/A || Incarnate Word  N/A
|-
| rowspan=1|Wed May 5 || 11:30am || New York || @ || Washington ||  || 65–60WAS || Coleman (15) || McWilliams-Franklin (11) || Mitchell (4) || Verizon Center  7,152
|-
| rowspan=1|Thu May 6 || 12:30 || Minnesota || @ || Chicago ||  || 74–65CHI || Kraayeveld (20) || 4 players (6) || Whalen (10) || Allstate Arena  N/A
|-
| rowspan=2|Fri May 7 || 12:00 || Chicago || @ || Indiana ||  || 69–63IND || Murphy (20) || Owino (11) || Battle (4) || Conseco Fieldhouse  7,291
|-
| 7:30 || Poland || @ || Connecticut ||  || 89–46CON || Charles, Kotsopoulos (15) || Charles (9) || Montgomery (5) || Mohegan Sun Arena  5,059
|-
| rowspan=2|Sat May 8 || 3:30 || San Antonio || @ || Los Angeles ||  || 86–77SA || Snell (17) || Clark (7) || Bobbitt, Darling, Quinn (4) || Walter Pyramid  1,521
|-
| 10:00 || China || @ || Phoenix ||  || 106–78PHO || Johnson (21) || Bonner, Liwei (7) || Zengyu (8) || US Airways Center  2,393
|-
| rowspan=2|Sun May 9 || 2:00 || Washington || @ || Atlanta ||  || 77–58WAS || Currie (16) || Atkinson, Langhorne (8) || 4 players (3) || Eblen Center  2,219
|-
| 2:00 || Seattle || @ || Tulsa ||  || 90–80TUL || Jackson (15) || Black (8) || Lacy, Pierson, Wright (4) || BOK Center  N/A
|-
| rowspan=1|Mon May 10 || 12:30 || Indiana || @ || Chicago ||  || 84–71CHI || Murphy (15) || Davenport (8) || Canty (6) || Allstate Arena  N/A
|-
| rowspan=1|Tue May 11 || 10:30am || Connecticut || @ || New York ||  || 89–84 (3OT)NY || Charles (22) || Charles, Walker (13) || Pondexter (8) || Madison Square Garden  19,763

|-
! style="background:#094480; color:white" | 2010 WNBA regular season
|-

|-
| rowspan=5|Sat 15 || 2:00 || Los Angeles || @ || Phoenix || ESPN2 || 78–77PHO || Parker (24) || Parker (12) || Riley (4) || US Airways Center  14,772
|-
| 3:30 || Chicago || @ || Connecticut || CN100 || 74–61CON || Jekabsone-Zogota (18) || Charles, Griffin (10) || Christon (4) || Mohegan Sun Arena  8,072
|- 
| 7:00 || Washington || @ || Indiana ||  || 72–65WAS || Currie (21) || Langhorne (8) || January (5) || Conseco Fieldhouse  9,752
|- 
| 8:00 || Atlanta || @ || San Antonio || FSSW || 75–70ATL || Castro Marques (23) || de Souza (15) || Lehning (6) || AT&T Center  9,409
|- 
| 8:00 || Minnesota || @ || Tulsa || NBA TVCST || 80–74MIN || Houston (21) || Black (10) || Whalen (6) || BOK Center  7,806
|- 
| rowspan=4|Sun 16 || 4:00 || Chicago || @ || New York || NBA TVCN100MSG || 85–82NY || Fowles (23) || Perkins (7) || Mitchell (9) || Madison Square Garden  12,088
|-
| 7:00 || Washington || @ || Minnesota || FSNN || 87–76WAS || Currie (27) || Langhorne, Melvin (9) || Whalen (7) || Target Center  9,985
|- 
| 7:00 || Indiana || @ || Atlanta || SSO || 66–62ATL || Catchings (18) || de Souza (11) || Douglas, Miller (6) || Philips Arena  7,337
|- 
| 9:00 || Los Angeles || @ || Seattle || KONG || 81–67SEA || Jackson (23) || Parker (11) || Penicheiro (6) || KeyArena  9,686
|- 
| rowspan=1|Wed 19 || 10:00 || Minnesota || @ || Seattle || KING || 79–76SEA || Cash (24) || Anosike (10) || Bird (10) || KeyArena  6,687
|- 
| rowspan=1|Thu 20 || 12:30 || San Antonio || @ || Tulsa || NBA TVFSSWFSOK || 83–74SA || Young (24) || Snow (15) || Hammon (7) || BOK Center  4,636
|- 
| rowspan=2|Fri 21 || 7:00 || New York || @ || Washington ||  || 77–61WAS || Harding (21) || Langhorne (11) || Pondexter (8) || Verizon Center  10,158
|- 
| 7:00 || Connecticut || @ || Atlanta || NBA TVCSN-NEFSSO || 97–82ATL || McCoughtry (32) || Lyttle (17) || Lehning (10) || Philips Arena  4,092
|- 
| rowspan=3|Sat 22 || 8:00 || Los Angeles || @ || San Antonio || NBA TVFSSW || 88–81SA || Milton-Jones (20) || Snow (12) || Milton-Jones (6) || AT&T Center  7,862
|- 
| 8:00 || Indiana || @ || Chicago || CN100 || 92–86 (OT)IND || Catchings (28) || Fowles (12) || Douglas, Murphy (6) || Allstate Arena  6,477
|- 
| 10:00 || Seattle || @ || Phoenix ||  || 95–89 (OT)SEA || Jackson (25) || Bonner (12) || Bird (8) || US Airways Center  10,144
|- 
| rowspan=4|Sun 23 || 3:00 || Washington || @ || Connecticut ||  || 80–65CON || Langhorne (16) || Charles (8) || Harding (5) || Mohegan Sun Arena  7,614
|-
| 4:00 || Atlanta || @ || New York ||  || 86–77ATL || McCoughtry, Pondexter (21) || Bales, de Souza (10) || McCoughtry (6) || Madison Square Garden  9,548
|- 
| 6:00 || Chicago || @ || Indiana || CN100FSI || 69–61IND || Murphy (16) || Fowles, Murphy (9) || Douglas (4) || Conseco Fieldhouse  7,665
|- 
| 7:00 || Tulsa || @ || Minnesota ||  || 94–82TUL || Houston (23) || Black (17) || Lacy (7) || Target Center  6,822
|- 
| rowspan=2|Tue 25 || 7:00 || Phoenix || @ || Tulsa || ESPN2 || 110–96PHO || Taurasi (35) || Dupree (14) || Lacy, Taylor (7) || BOK Center  4,100
|- 
| 10:00 || Washington || @ || Seattle ||  || 82–76SEA || Currie (24) || Jackson (7) || Bird (7) || KeyArena  6,612
|- 
| rowspan=2|Thu 27 || 7:30 || Minnesota || @ || Connecticut ||  || 105–79CON || Montgomery (23) || Charles (10) || Lawson, Montgomery (6) || Mohegan Sun Arena  6,401
|- 
| 8:00 || Seattle || @ || Chicago || CN100 || 84–75CHI || Fowles (19) || Jackson (11) || Bird, Canty (4) || Allstate Arena  2,923
|- 
| rowspan=3|Fri 28 || 8:00 || New York || @ || San Antonio ||  || 77–71NY || Pondexter (21) || McCarville, Powell (7) || Hammon (8) || AT&T Center  5,293
|- 
| 10:00 || Atlanta || @ || Phoenix ||  || 96–93ATL || Taurasi (30) || Lyttle (17) || Taylor (7) || US Airways Center  7,986
|- 
| 10:30 || Washington || @ || Los Angeles || PRIME || 81–75LA || Parker (30) || Langhorne, Parker (10) || Harding (8) || Staples Center  13,154
|- 
| rowspan=2|Sat 29 || 8:00 || Chicago || @ || Minnesota || CN100 || 73–58CHI || Fowles (18) || Brunson (9) || Canty, Prince (4) || Target Center  6,129
|- 
| 8:00 || Indiana || @ || Tulsa || NBA TVFSOK || 79–74TUL || Holt (16) || Black (11) || Catchings (7) || BOK Center  4,005
|- 
| rowspan=3|Sun 30 || 3:00 || Seattle || @ || San Antonio ||  || 84–56SEA || Jackson (27) || Cash (8) || Bird (6) || AT&T Center  4,924
|- 
| 4:00 || Connecticut || @ || Washington ||  || 69–65WAS || Currie (18) || Langhorne (16) || Harding (9) || Verizon Center  8,602
|- 
| 8:00 || Atlanta || @ || Los Angeles ||  || 101–82ATL || Parker (33) || Lyttle (13) || Penicheiro (6) || Staples Center  8,404

|-
| rowspan=2|Tue 1 || 7:30 || Phoenix || @ || Minnesota || ESPN2 || 92–82MIN || Wright (32) || Brunson (15) || Anosike, Johnson, Whalen (5) || Target Center  6,854
|- 
| 9:30 || Atlanta || @ || Seattle || ESPN2 || 90–72SEA || Jackson (32) || Jackson (10) || Bird (6) || KeyArena  7,586
|-
| rowspan=1|Thu 3 || 7:00 || San Antonio || @ || Indiana || FSSWFSI || 79–57IND || Douglas (22) || Catchings (7) || Lawson-Wade (4) || Conseco Fieldhouse  7,574
|- 
| rowspan=4|Fri 4 || 7:00 || Chicago || @ || Atlanta || CN100FSSO || 80–70CHI || Fowles (19) || Fowles (9) || Christon (8) || Philips Arena  2,515
|-
| 7:30 || New York || @ || Connecticut ||  || 75–68CON || White (18) || Charles (15) || Lawson (6) || Mohegan Sun Arena  6,493
|- 
| 8:00 || Minnesota || @ || Tulsa || FSOK || 92–79TUL || Brunson (23) || Black, Brunson (11) || Lacy (6) || BOK Center  4,521
|- 
| 10:00 || Los Angeles || @ || Phoenix ||  || 90–89PHO || Parker (26) || Parker (12) || Penicheiro (10) || US Airways Center  6,485
|- 
| rowspan=4|Sat 5 || 7:00 || Atlanta || @ || Washington ||  || 86–79 (OT)ATL || de Souza, Langhorne, McCoughtry (23) || Lyttle (17) || Castro Marques, K. Miller (6) || Verizon Center  8,986
|-
| 7:00 || New York || @ || Indiana ||  || 78–73IND || Pondexter (21) || Sutton-Brown (8) || Catchings (9) || Conseco Fieldhouse  8,090
|- 
| 8:00 || Tulsa || @ || Chicago || CN100 || 95–70CHI || Fowles (32) || Fowles (13) || Lacy (7) || Allstate Arena  4,549
|- 
| 11:00 || Seattle || @ || Los Angeles || NBA TVFSW || 79–75SEA || Parker (24) || Jackson (9) || Bird (6) || Home Depot Center  6,026
|- 
| rowspan=3|Sun 6 || 1:00 || San Antonio || @ || Connecticut ||  || 81–68CON || Young (21) || Charles (11) || Lawson-Wade (9) || Mohegan Sun Arena  6,292
|-
| 7:00 || Indiana || @ || Minnesota || FSNN || 89–51IND || Catchings (27) || Brunson (12) || Anosike, Wiggins (3) || Target Center  6,444
|- 
| 9:00 || Phoenix || @ || Seattle || KONG || 97–74SEA || Cash, Jackson, Little (16) || T. Smith (8) || Bird (11) || KeyArena  7,827
|- 
| rowspan=2|Tue 8 || 8:00 || New York || @ || Chicago || CN100 || 85–70NYL || Pondexter (31) || McWilliams-Franklin (9) || 7 players (3) || Allstate Arena  2,408
|-
| 10:30 || Phoenix || @ || Los Angeles || PRIME || 92–91LAS || Parker (22) || Parker (12) || Johnson, Taylor, Quinn (7) || Staples Center  7,993
|- 
| rowspan=1|Thu 10 || 10:00 || Minnesota || @ || Phoenix || FSA || 99–88PHO || Taurasi (31) || Brunson (12) || Johnson (10) || US Airways Center  5,504
|- 
| rowspan=5|Fri 11 || 7:30 || Atlanta || @ || New York ||  || 91–79NYL || Pondexter (25) || Lyttle (14) || Pondexter (7) || Madison Square Garden  8,332
|-
| 7:30 || Indiana || @ || Connecticut || CSN-NE || 86–77CON || Montgomery (29) || Charles (12) || Douglas, Jekabsone-Zogota (5) || Mohegan Sun Arena  7,603
|- 
| 8:00 || Tulsa || @ || San Antonio ||  || 87–75SAN || Holdsclaw (19) || Holdsclaw (11) || Lawson-Wade (9) || AT&T Center  7,076
|- 
| 8:30 || Washington || @ || Chicago || CN100 || 95–78WAS || Harding (25) || Currie, Langhorne (8) || Currie, Harding (5) || Allstate Arena  3,107
|- 
| 10:00 || Los Angeles || @ || Seattle || KONG || 82–60SEA || Jackson (17) || Jackson (9) || Bird (5) || KeyArena  7,286
|- 
| rowspan=2|Sat 12 || 7:00 || New York || @ || Washington || CSN-MA || 82–65WAS || Pondexter, Currie (20) || Langhorne (9) || Currie (4) || Verizon Center  8,492 
|- 
| 10:00 || Tulsa || @ || Phoenix ||  || 116–84PHX || Dupree, Taurasi (18) || Hornbuckle (8) || Taylor (8) || US Airways Center  6,580
|- 
| rowspan=3|Sun 13 || 3:00 || San Antonio || @ || Atlanta || NBA TVSSO || 90–83ATL || Lyttle, Young (24) || Lyttle (12) || Lehning (8) || Philips Arena  6,050
|-
| 3:00 || Minnesota || @ || Los Angeles ||  || 88–84LAS || Milton-Jones (22) || Brunson (15) || Whalen (7) || Staples Center  7,005
|-
| 6:00 || Connecticut || @ || Indiana ||  || 77–67IND || Douglas (20) || Catchings (13) || Douglas, Jekabsone-Zogota (3) || Conseco Fieldhouse  7,302
|- 
| rowspan=1|Tue 15 || 8:00 || Atlanta || @ || Chicago || CN100 || 93–86ATL || Castro Marques (31) || de Souza (13) || Lehning (9) || Allstate Arena  3,292
|- 
| rowspan=1|Thu 17 || 7:00 || Seattle || @ || Indiana || FSI || 72–65IND || Jackson (17) || Jackson (9) || Cash, Douglas (4) || Conseco Fieldhouse  7,520
|- 
| rowspan=4|Fri 18 || 7:30 || Seattle || @ || New York ||  || 92–84SEA || Pondexter (24) || Jackson (12) || Bird (10) || Madison Square Garden  8,883 
|-
| 8:00 || Tulsa || @ || Minnesota ||  || 78–67MIN || Augustus (27) || Anosike (9) || Whalen (12) || Target Center  6,953
|- 
| 10:00 || San Antonio || @ || Phoenix ||  || 108–105SAN || Taurasi (39) || Dupree (11) || Hammon (10) || US Airways Center  6,147
|- 
| 10:30 || Connecticut || @ || Los Angeles ||  || 78–75CON || Charles (26) || Charles (19) || Penicheiro (8) || Staples Center  8,852
|- 
| rowspan=3|Sat 19 || 7:00 || Chicago || @ || Washington || NBA TVCN100CSN-MA || 65–61 (OT)WAS || Fowles, Smith (17) || Langhorne (10) || Sanford (6) || Verizon Center  9,034
|-
| 7:00 || Atlanta || @ || Indiana ||  || 94–91IND || McCoughtry,Marques (21) || Lyttle (20) || Catchings (6) || Conseco Fieldhouse  8,187
|- 
| 8:00 || Minnesota || @ || Tulsa || CST || 92–78MIN || Wiggins (19) || Brunson (11) || Whalen (6) || BOK Center  5,013
|- 
| rowspan=2|Sun 20 || 6:00 || Connecticut || @ || Phoenix || NBA TVFSA || 96–94CON || Charles, Taurasi (24) || Charles (12) || Lawson (5) || US Airways Center  6,068
|-
| 9:00 || San Antonio || @ || Seattle || NBA TVFSSW || 82–61SEA || Cash (22) || Jackson (14) ||Wright (6)  || KeyArena  8,086
|- 
| rowspan=2|Tue 22 || 7:30 || Minnesota || @ || New York ||  || 75–68MIN || Brunson (21) || Brunson (13) || Pondexter (5) || Madison Square Garden  7,537
|-
| 7:30 || Chicago || @ || Connecticut || CN100 || 86–77CHI || Prince (19) || Charles (16) || Montgomery (6) || Mohegan Sun Arena  6,981
|- 
| rowspan=1|Wed 23 || 12:00 || Tulsa || @ || Atlanta || NBA TVFSOKSSO || 96–90ATL || McCoughtry (29) || Black,Lyttle (12) || Marques (8) || Philips Arena  9,598
|- 
| rowspan=1|Thu 24 || 7:00 || Los Angeles || @ || Washington || CSN-MA || 68–53WAS || Langhorne (27) || Langhorne (14) || Penicheiro (4) || Verizon Center  8,160
|- 
| rowspan=4|Fri 25 || 7:30 || Phoenix || @ || Connecticut || CSN-NE || 82–79CON ||Taurasi (26)  || Charles (23) || Taurasi,Montgomery (6) || Mohegan Sun Arena  9,518
|-
| 8:00 || New York || @ || Tulsa || CST || 92–78NY || Mitchell (20) || Franklin (11) || Powell,Franklin (6) || BOK Center  4,554
|- 
| 8:30 || Washington || @ || Chicago || CN100 || 79–72CHI || Langhorne (25) || Langhorne (13) || Perkins (5) || Allstate Arena  3,419
|- 
| 10:00 || Indiana || @ || Seattle ||  || 85–81SEA || Douglas (29) || Jackson (7) || Wright (10) || KeyArena  9,083
|- 
| rowspan=1|Sat 26 || 8:00 || Minnesota || @ || San Antonio || NBA TVFSSW || 80–66SAN || Snow (23) || Brunson,Snow (9) || Hammon (10) || AT&T Center  10,184
|- 
| rowspan=5|Sun 27 || 3:00 || Los Angeles || @ || Atlanta || NBA TVSSO || 89–81ATL || Marques (25) || Jones,Lyttle (11) || Penicheiro (10) || Philips Arena  7,855
|-
| 4:00 || Connecticut || @ || New York || CSN-NE || 77–68NY || Pondexter (19) || Charles (16) || Montgomery,Pondexter (5) || Madison Square Garden  15,293
|- 
| 4:00 || Seattle || @ || Tulsa || CST || 83–72SEA || Jackson (24) || Little (9) || Wright (10) || BOK Center  4,865
|- 
| 4:00 || Phoenix || @ || Washington || NBA TVCSN-MA || 95–85WAS || Langhorne (31) || Langhorne (10) || Smith (6) || Verizon Center  7,547
|- 
| 6:00 || Indiana || @ || Chicago || CN100 || 70–64IND || Thorn (15) || Fowles (17) || Catchings,Douglas (4) || Allstate Arena  4,051
|- 
| rowspan=5|Tue 29 || 7:00 || Indiana || @ || Washington || ESPN2 || 68–65WAS || Smith (21) || Langhorne (10) || Douglas (5) || Verizon Center  8,464
|-
| 7:00 || Phoenix || @ || Atlanta || SSO || 94–88ATL || Taylor (31) || Bonner,Leuchanka (9) || Johnson (12) || Philips Arena  4,073
|- 
| 8:00 || Connecticut || @ || Tulsa || CST || 101–89CON || Robinson (19) || Charles (12) || Brown (7) || BOK Center  3,649
|- 
| 10:00 || San Antonio || @ || Seattle ||  || 86–72SEA || Jackson (31) || Jackson (15) || Wright (12) || KeyArena  7,823
|- 
| 10:30 || New York || @ || Los Angeles || NBA TVPRIME || 80–68NY || Quinn (24) || Powell,McCarville (7) || Pondexter,Mitchell (5) || Staples Center  8,602

|- 
| rowspan=4|Thu 1 || 7:00 || Minnesota || @ || Atlanta || SSO || 76–58ATL || Marques (22) || Lyttle (14) || Shalee Lehning (5) || Philips Arena  4,020
|-
| 8:00 || Connecticut || @ || Chicago || CN100 || 92–80CHI || Fowles (26) || Fowles (11) || Montgomery,Bass,Canty (5) || Allstate Arena  3,061
|- 
| 10:00 || Washington || @ || Phoenix || FSA || 107–104WAS || Smith (25) || Crystal Langhorne,Dupree (9) || Johnson (11) || US Airways Center  5,509
|- 
| 10:30 || San Antonio || @ || Los Angeles ||  || 73–63LA || Thompson (24) || Thompson (10) || Lawson (5) || Staples Center  7,803
|- 
| rowspan=4|Sat 3 || 5:00 || Seattle || @ || Los Angeles || ESPN2 || 75–62SEA || Jackson (20) || Thompson,Hylton (10) || Bird (7) || Staples Center  9,319
|-
| 7:00 || Chicago || @ || Atlanta || NBA TVCN100SSO || 88–82CHI || Fowles (22) || Souza (15) || Lyttle,Miller (3) || Philips Arena  6,920
|- 
| 8:00 || Washington || @ || Tulsa || CST || 69–54WAS || Currie (17) || Coleman (10) || Smith,Harding,Coleman (4) || BOK Center  3,516
|- 
| 10:00 || New York || @ || Phoenix ||  || 97–82PHO || Dupree (24) || Smith (10) || Mitchell,Taurasi (5) || US Airways Center  6,780
|- 
| rowspan=4|Tue 6 || 3:00 || New York || @ || Seattle ||  || 78–70SEA || Franklin,Cash (20) || Cash (11) || Pondexter (5) || KeyArena  11,012
|-
| 8:00 || Connecticut || @ || San Antonio || ESPN2 || 79–66SA || Young (19) || Charles (13) || Snow (8) || AT&T Center  7,264
|- 
| 8:00 || Indiana || @ || Chicago || CN100 || 58–51IND || Fowles (26) || Fowles (18) || January (5) || Allstate Arena  3,732
|- 
| 10:00 || Phoenix || @ || Los Angeles || ESPN2 || 98–89PHO || Johnson (30) || Dupree (12) || Taurasi (7) || Staples Center  8,336
|- 
| rowspan=1|Wed 7 || 7:00 || Connecticut || @ || Atlanta || SSO || 108–103ATL (OT) || McCoughtry,Marques (32) || Charles (20) || Lawson,Lehning (8) || Philips Arena  5,305
|- 
| rowspan=2|Thu 8 || 7:00 || Tulsa || @ || Indiana ||  || 100–72IND || Catchings (24) || Black (12) || January (6) || Conseco Fieldhouse  7,077
|-
| 8:00 || San Antonio || @ || Minnesota ||  || 89–66MIN || Brunson (24) || Brunson (10) || Darling,Augustus,Whalen (5) || Target Center  7,182
|-
| rowspan=1 style="background:#FAFAD2"|Sat 10 ||style="background:#FAFAD2"| 3:30 || style="background:#FAFAD2"|USA || style="background:#FAFAD2"|@ || style="background:#FAFAD2"|WNBA || style="background:#FAFAD2"|ESPN ||style="background:#FAFAD2"|  99–72USA||style="background:#FAFAD2"| Fowles (23) ||style="background:#FAFAD2"| Fowles,Dupree,Moore (8) ||style="background:#FAFAD2"| Pondexter (6)  ||style="background:#FAFAD2"| Mohegan Sun Arena  9,518
|- 
| rowspan=1|Sun 11 || 4:00 || Chicago || @ || New York || MSG || 57–54NY || Pondexter (30) || Fowles (19) || McCarville (4) || Madison Square Garden  9,644
|- 
| rowspan=1|Tue 13 || 7:00 || Los Angeles || @ || Tulsa || ESPN2 || 87–71LA || Thompson (24) || Braxton (10) || Penicheiro (9) || BOK Center  7,073
|- 
| rowspan=4|Wed 14 || 12:30 || San Antonio || @ || Chicago || CN100 || 88–61CHI || Young,Fowles,Perkins,Prince (14) || Snow (8) || Canty,Prince (5) || Allstate Arena  6,950
|-
| 1:00 || Atlanta || @ || Minnesota ||  || 83–81MIN || McCoughtry (25) || Souza (20) || Whalen (7) || Target Center  12,311
|- 
| 1:00 || Connecticut || @ || Indiana ||  || 77–68CON || Catchings (22) || Catchings (9) || Lawson (5) || Conseco Fieldhouse  10,076
|- 
| 3:30 || Seattle || @ || Phoenix || FSA || 111–107SEA (3 OT) || Taurasi (44) || Jackson (18) || Bird (8) || US Airways Center  13,508
|- 
| rowspan=1|Thu 15 || 12:00 || Washington || @ || New York ||  || 75–67NY || Langhorne (19) || McCarville (12) || Pondexter (7) || Madison Square Garden  18,162
|- 
| rowspan=3|Fri 16 || 7:00 || Atlanta || @ || Indiana ||  || 89–70IND || McCoughtry (27) || Catchings (11) || Catchings,Douglas,January (4) || Conseco Fieldhouse  7,532
|-
| 8:00 || Tulsa || @ || San Antonio ||  || 75–70TUL || Holdsclaw (20) || Young (12) || Latta,Snow (4) || AT&T Center  9,298
|- 
| 8:30 || Los Angeles || @ || Chicago || CN100 || 80–68CHI || Milton-Jones (21) || Fowles (10) || Penicheiro (9) || Allstate Arena  4,841
|- 
| rowspan=3|Sat 17 || 3:30 || Seattle || @ || Minnesota ||  || 73–71SEA || Jackson (26) || Cash (11) || Wright (10) || Target Center  7,216
|-
| 7:00 || Atlanta || @ || Connecticut ||  || 96–80CON || McCoughtry (27) || Charles (14) || White (7) || Mohegan Sun Arena  7,378
|- 
| 10:00 || Tulsa || @ || Phoenix ||  || 97–88PHO || Taylor (29) || Black (13) || Taurasi (8) || US Airways Center  8,564
|- 
| rowspan=3|Sun 18 || 3:00 || Los Angeles || @ || San Antonio ||  || 83–73SAN || Hodges (24) || Thompson (8) || Hammon (7) || AT&T Center  6,542
|-
| 4:00 || Indiana || @ || New York || MSG || 84–81IND (OT) || Pondexter (40) || Catchings (10) || Catchings,Pondexter (7) || Madison Square Garden  9,508
|- 
| 4:00 || Chicago || @ || Washington || CSN-MA || 61–59CHI || Fowles (13) || Fowles (11) || Harding (6) || Verizon Center  8,790
|- 
| rowspan=3|Tue 20 || 12:30 || Seattle || @ || San Antonio || NBA TVFSSW || 80–74SEA || Jackson (21) || Cash,Fowles,Young (7) || Hammon (10) || AT&T Center  12,414
|-
| 3:00 || Tulsa || @ || Los Angeles ||  || 86–83LA (OT) || Milton-Jones (23) || Jackson (9) || Penicheiro (13) || Staples Center  14,413
|- 
| 8:00 || New York || @ || Connecticut || ESPN2 || 82–74NY (OT) || Pondexter (24) || Griffin (9) || Pondexter (6) || Mohegan Sun Arena  6,478
|- 
| rowspan=1|Wed 21 || 11:30am || Atlanta || @ || Washington || NBA TVCSN-MA || 82–72WAS || Langhorne (24) || Langhorne (15) || Castro Marques (6) || Verizon Center  14,347
|- 
| rowspan=3|Thu 22 || 7:00 || Los Angeles || @ || Indiana || ESPN2 || 76–57IND || Thompson (19) || Hoffman, Milton-Jones, Thompson (8) || Catchings, Penicheiro (6) || Conseco Fieldhouse  7,898
|-
| 8:00 || Phoenix || @ || Tulsa || CST || 123–91PHO || Taurasi (26) || Jackson (9) || Johnson (7) || BOK Center  3,333
|- 
| 8:00 || San Antonio || @ || Minnesota ||  || 74–72SA || Augustus (22) || Brunson (14) || Whalen (8) || Target Center  6,126
|- 
| rowspan=1|Fri 23 || 8:30 || New York || @ || Chicago || CN100 || 79–71NY || McWilliams-Franklin (18) || Fowles (16) || Canty, Pondexter (6) || Allstate Arena  5,256
|- 
| rowspan=4|Sat 24 || 7:00 || Indiana || @ || Washington || NBA TVCSN-MA || 78–73IND || January (19) || Langhorne (13) || January (8) || Verizon Center  9,786
|-
| 7:00 || Los Angeles || @ || Connecticut || CSN-NE || 89–80LA || Milton-Jones (20) || Charles, Jones (9) || Milton-Jones, Penicheiro (7) || Mohegan Sun Arena  8,097
|- 
| 8:00 || Chicago || @ || San Antonio || CN100 || 75–72CHI || Fowles (23) || Fowles (12) || Canty (6) || AT&T Center  8,999
|-
| 8:00 || Phoenix || @ || Minnesota || NBA TVFSNN || 127–124 (2OT)PHO || Augustus (36) || Brunson (17) || Whalen (10) || Target Center  8,518
|- 
| rowspan=2|Sun 25 || 3:00 || New York || @ || Atlanta || NBA TVSSO || 82–75ATL || McCoughtry (28) || de Souza, McCoughtry (10) || McCoughtry, Pondexter (6) || Philips Arena  7,030
|-
| 9:00 || Tulsa || @ || Seattle || KONG || 75–59SEA || Crossley (19) || Willingham (10) || Bird, Wright (6) || KeyArena  9,686
|- 
| rowspan=6|Tue 27 || 1:30 || Atlanta || @ || Tulsa || NBA TVCST || 105-89ATL || Castro Marques, Latta (23) || Lyttle (14) || Latta, Lehning (6) || BOK Center  3,800
|-
| 7:00 || Chicago || @ || Indiana || CN100 || 78-74IND || Fowles (18) || Catchings (10) || Tamika Catchings (6) || Conseco Fieldhouse  6,853
|- 
| 7:30 || San Antonio || @ || New York || ESPN2 || 77-72NY || Holdsclaw (18) || Holdsclaw (9) || Mitchell (8) || Madison Square Garden  10,712  
|-
| 7:30 || Washington || @ || Connecticut ||  || 88-78CON || Jones, Langhorne (23) || Charles, Currie (9) || Lawson (7) || Mohegan Sun Arena  6,322
|-
| 8:00 || Los Angeles || @ || Minnesota ||  || 71-58LA || Thompson (24) || Brunson (11) || Penicheiro (9) || Target Center  6,215
|-
| 9:30 || Phoenix || @ || Seattle || ESPN2 || 91-85SEA || Jackson (33) || Jackson (11) || Bird (7) || KeyArena  8,044
|- 
| rowspan=2|Thu 29 || 7:00 || San Antonio || @ || Washington || NBA TVCSN-MA || 79-75SA || Currie (22) || Langhorne (11) || Hammon (6) || Verizon Center  9,212
|-
| 10:00 || Minnesota || @ || Phoenix ||  || 110-92PHO || Houston (26) || Houston (13) || Johnson (8) || US Airways Center  7,037
|- 
| rowspan=5|Fri 30 || 7:00 || Washington || @ || Indiana ||  || 77-73WAS || Harding (33) || Langhorne (11) || Catchings (7) || Conseco Fieldhouse  8,207
|-
| 7:30 || Los Angeles || @ || New York ||  || 88-79NY || Pondexter (20) || McWilliams-Franklin (9) || Penicheiro (7) || Madison Square Garden  14,307
|- 
| 7:30 || Atlanta || @ || Connecticut ||  || 94-62ATL || McCoughtry (20) || de Souza (13) || Lawson, K. Miller, Price (5) || Mohegan Sun Arena  7,003
|-
| 8:00 || San Antonio || @ || Tulsa || NBA TVFSOK || 101-85SA || Hammon (22) || Jackson, Snow (7) || Brown (5) || BOK Center  5,203
|-
| 10:00 || Chicago || @ || Seattle || NBA TVKONG || 80-60SEA || Cash (16) || Bass, Little, Willingham (7) || Bird (8) || KeyArena  7,749

|- 
| rowspan=5|Sun 1 || 3:00 || Indiana || @ || Atlanta || NBA TVSSO || 90-74ATL || Catchings (24) || Davenport (12) || Lehning, McCoughtry (7) || Philips Arena  6,270
|-
| 4:00 || Connecticut || @ || New York || MSG || 71-67NY || Pondexter (24) || Charles (10) || Montgomery, Powell (5) || Madison Square Garden  9,341
|- 
| 4:00 || Tulsa || @ || Washington || NBA TVCSN-MA || 87-62WAS || Currie, Smith (15) || Coleman (10) || Coleman, Harding (4) || Verizon Center  9,008
|-
| 6:00 || Chicago || @ || Phoenix || NBA TVCN100FSA || 97-96PHO || Fowles, Taurasi (35) || Fowles (8) || Taurasi (11) || US Airways Center  11,237
|-
| 7:00 || Seattle || @ || Minnesota || NBA TVFSNN || 72-71MIN || Augustus (24) || Brunson (8) || Bird (10) || Target Center  7,312
|- 
| rowspan=5|Tue 3 || 7:00 || New York || @ || Indiana || FSI || 82-72NY || Powell (20) || McCarville (10) || Pondexter (5) || Conseco Fieldhouse  7,540
|-
| 7:30 || Washington || @ || Atlanta || ESPN2 || 86-78WAS || McCoughtry (30) || Langhorne (12) || Harding, Lehning (6) || Philips Arena  9,072
|- 
| 8:00 || Phoenix || @ || San Antonio ||  || 103-92PHO || Dupree, Young (24) || Dupree (12) || Hammon (11) || AT&T Center  6,116
|-
| 8:00 || Seattle || @ || Tulsa || CST || 84-75TUL || Robinson (21) || Bird (7) || Latta, Wright (7) || BOK Center  3,697
|-
| 8:00 || Connecticut || @ || Minnesota || CSN-NE || 111-103 (OT)MIN || Montgomery (33) || Charles (21) || Whalen (12) || Target Center  5,954
|- 
| rowspan=1|Wed 4 || 10:30 || Chicago || @ || Los Angeles || NBA TVCN100 || 82-77LA || Milton-Jones (22) || Wisdom-Hylton (13) || Penicheiro (15) || Staples Center  9,732
|- 
| rowspan=1|Thu 5 || 10:30 || Connecticut || @ || Seattle || ESPN2 || 83-82SEA || Jackson (31) || Jones (9) || Montgomery (10) || KeyArena  7,539
|- 
| rowspan=4|Fri 6 || 7:00 || Atlanta || @ || Indiana ||  || 95-93IND || McCoughtry (31) || Catchings, Lyttle (8) || Lehning (6) || Conseco Fieldhouse  9,214
|-
| 7:30 || Washington || @ || New York ||  || 85-77NY || Currie, Pondexter (23) || Currie, Melvin (6) || Mitchell (6) || Madison Square Garden  11,465
|- 
| 10:00 || San Antonio || @ || Phoenix ||  || 103-87PHO || Hammon, Holdsclaw (21) || Holdsclaw (9) || Taylor (8) || US Airways Center  12,909
|-
| 10:30 || Tulsa || @ || Los Angeles ||  || 77-70LA || Milton-Jones (23) || Jackson (9) || Penicheiro (13) || Staples Center  8,962
|- 
| rowspan=2|Sat 7 || 3:00 || Minnesota || @ || Chicago || ESPN2 || 87-82 (OT)MIN || Augustus (27) || Fowles (11) || Whalen (7) || Allstate Arena  4,992
|-
| 10:00 || Tulsa || @ || Seattle || KONG || 111-65SEA || Abrosimova (20) || Jackson (10) || Abrosimova (8) || KeyArena  9,686
|- 
| rowspan=4|Sun 8 || 5:00 || Washington || @ || Connecticut ||  || 76-67CON || Charles, Jones (17) || Charles (14) || Montgomery (7) || Mohegan Sun Arena  7,076
|-
| 6:00 || Indiana || @ || Phoenix ||  || 104-82IND || Douglas (28) || Catchings (10) || Taurasi (7) || US Airways Center  10,995
|- 
| 7:00 || New York || @ || Minnesota || NBA TVFSNN || 74-72NY || Powell (21) || Brunson (18) || Mitchell, Pondexter, Powell (4) || Target Center  9,016
|-
| 8:00 || San Antonio || @ || Los Angeles || NBA TVFSSWFSW || 92-83SA || Thompson (23) || Young (10) || Penicheiro (8) || Staples Center  9,793
|- 
| rowspan=5|Tue 10 || 7:00 || Connecticut || @ || Washington || NBA TVCSN-MA || 84-74WAS || Langhorne (23) || Charles (15) || Harding (6) || Verizon Center  8,180
|-
| 7:00 || Seattle || @ || Atlanta || FSSO || 80-70SEA || McCoughtry (16) || Lyttle (17) || Abrosimova, Lehning (6) || Philips Arena  6,042
|- 
| 8:00 || Minnesota || @ || San Antonio ||  || 73-68MIN || Augustus (20) || Brunson (12) || Hammon (8) || AT&T Center  5,142
|-
| 8:00 || Phoenix || @ || Chicago ||  || 91-82CHI || Taurasi (28) || Fowles (14) || Taylor (6) || Allstate Arena  4,089
|-
| 10:00 || Indiana || @ || Los Angeles || ESPN2 || 82-76IND || Thompson (23) || Thompson (13) || Bevilaqua, Riley (6) || Staples Center  10,586
|- 
| rowspan=1|Thu 12 || 8:00 || Los Angeles || @ || Minnesota ||  || 78-77LA || Houston (24) || Brunson (14) || Penicheiro (10) || Target Center  7,867
|- 
| rowspan=5|Fri 13 || 7:00 || Minnesota || @ || Washington ||  || 61-58WAS || Harding (15) || Langhorne (14) || Whalen (5) || Verizon Center  7,752
|-
| 7:00 || Phoenix || @ || Indiana ||  || 110-90IND || Catchings (29) || Catchings (7) || Catchings (6) || Conseco Fieldhouse  10,002
|- 
| 7:00 || New York || @ || Atlanta || SSO || 90-83NY || Pondexter (31) || Lyttle (13) || Lehning (8) || Philips Arena  6,025
|-
| 7:30 || Seattle || @ || Connecticut ||  || 88-68CON || Jones (19) || Gruda (9) || Abrosimova (6) || Mohegan Sun Arena  9,197
|-
| 8:00 || Tulsa || @ || San Antonio ||  || 94-74SA || Holdsclaw (18) || Kelly (9) || Hammon (8) || AT&T Center  10,244
|- 
| rowspan=3|Sat 14 || 7:30 || Phoenix || @ || New York || NBA TVMSG || 107-69NY || Pondexter (28) || Braxton, Dupree (8) || McCarville (6) || Madison Square Garden  9,645
|-
| 8:00 || Los Angeles || @ || Tulsa || CST || 92-87LA || Latta (26) || Jackson (13) || Penicheiro (9) || BOK Center  5,719
|- 
| 8:00 || Atlanta || @ || Chicago || CN100 || 98-74ATL || Prince (18) || Bales (12) || Price (6) || Allstate Arena  4,214
|- 
| rowspan=3|Sun 15 || 4:00 || Seattle || @ || Washington ||  || 80-71WAS || Currie (25) || Langhorne (7) || Bird (7) || Verizon Center  9,438
|-
| 5:00 || Indiana || @ || Connecticut ||  || 79-66IND || Catchings (26) || Charles (13) || Montgomery (8) || Mohegan Sun Arena  7,915
|- 
| 7:00 || San Antonio || @ || Minnesota || NBA TVFSSWFSNN || 84-78MIN || Hammon (30) || Brunson, Houston (8) || Whalen (12) || Target Center  8,678
|- 
| rowspan=6|Tue 17 || 7:00 || Chicago || @ || Atlanta || NBA TVFSSO || 84-79CHI || Castro Marques (19) || Fowles (14) || Young (5) || Philips Arena  5,209
|-
| 7:30 || Indiana || @ || New York ||  || 78-57NY || Catchings (25) || McWilliams-Franklin (10) || Pondexter (6) || Madison Square Garden  8,953
|- 
| 7:30 || Tulsa || @ || Connecticut || CSN-NE || 90-62CON || Montgomery (22) || Charles (10) || Charles (4) || Mohegan Sun Arena  8,828
|-
| 8:00 || Washington || @ || San Antonio ||  || 76-66WAS || Langhorne (21) || Langhorne (12) || Smith (6) || AT&T Center  6,801
|-
| 10:00 || Minnesota || @ || Seattle ||  || 68-64SEA || Jackson (24) || Little (14) || Bird (8) || KeyArena  7,394
|-
| 10:30 || Phoenix || @ || Los Angeles || NBA TVPRIME || 90-84PHO || Thompson (33) || Dupree, Taylor (11) || Penicheiro (11) || Staples Center  8,817
|- 
| rowspan=1|Thu 19 || 7:30 || Tulsa || @ || New York ||  || 95-85NY || Powell (20) || Black (9) || Mitchell (8) || Madison Square Garden  8,766
|- 
| rowspan=5|Fri 20 || 7:00 || New York || @ || Washington ||  || 75-74WAS || Pondexter (28) || Langhorne (7) || Powell (5) || Verizon Center  13,109
|-
| 8:00 || Indiana || @ || San Antonio ||  || 75-61SA || Young (22) || Snow (8) || Snow,Hammon (6) || AT&T Center  10,807
|- 
| 8:30 || Connecticut || @ || Chicago || NBA TVCN100 || 78-71CON || Montgomery (20) || Griffin (11) || Canty (7) || Allstate Arena  5,598 
|-
| 10:00 || Seattle || @ || Phoenix ||  || 78-73SEA || Braxton (15) || Bird,Bonner (7) || Bird (5) || US Airways Center  12,459
|-
| 10:30 || Minnesota || @ || Los Angeles ||  || 98-91LA || Thompson (26) || Thompson (9) || Penicheiro (12) || Staples Center  13,154
|- 
| rowspan=2|Sat 21 || 8:00 || Chicago || @ || Tulsa || NBA TVFSOK || 84-71TUL || Crossley, Jackson (17) || Jackson (9) || Canty, Latta (5) || BOK Center  6,321
|-
| 11:00 || Los Angeles || @ || Seattle || ESPN2 || 75-74SEA || Little (22) || Milton-Jones (9) || Bird (9) || KeyArena  9,686
|- 
| rowspan=4|Sun 22 || 3:00 || Phoenix || @ || San Antonio ||  || 83-82SA || Hammon (30) || Bonner (12) || Hodges (6) || AT&T Center  8,331
|-
| 3:00 || Washington || @ || Atlanta || SSO || 90-81WAS || Currie (20) || Langhorne, Lyttle (11) || Harding (8) || Philips Arena  9,570
|- 
| 4:00 || Connecticut || @ || New York || MSG || 88-87 (OT)NY || Pondexter (31) || Charles (13) || Pondexter (6) || Madison Square Garden  15,989
|-
| 5:00 || Minnesota || @ || Indiana || NBA TVFSI || 83-79 (OT)MIN || Augustus (25) || Catchings (14) || January (7) || Conseco Fieldhouse  10,015

|-
! style="background:#094480; color:white" | 2010 WNBA postseason
|-

|-
| rowspan=2|Wed 25 || 8:00 || Atlanta || @ || Washington || NBA TV || 95-90ATL || McCoughtry (28) || Currie (11) || Price (8) || Verizon Center  10,322
|- 
| 11:00 || Los Angeles || @ || Seattle || ESPN2 || 79-66SEA || Cash (20) || Jackson (9) || Bird (12) || KeyArena  10,589
|-
| rowspan=2|Thu 26 || 7:00 || Indiana || @ || New York || NBA TVMSG || 85-73NY || Pondexter (28) || McWilliams-Franklin (10) || McCarville (7) || Madison Square Garden  14,624
|- 
| 9:00 || San Antonio || @ || Phoenix || ESPN2 || 106-93PHO || Dupree (32) || Young (9) || Taurasi (10) || US Airways Center  8,927
|-
| rowspan=1|Fri 27 || 7:30 || Washington || @ || Atlanta || NBA TVFSSO || 101-77ATL || Castro Marques, McCoughtry (21) || Lyttle (10) || Lehning (9) || Philips Arena  7,890
|-
| rowspan=2|Sat 28 || 1:00 || Phoenix || @ || San Antonio || ESPN2 || 92-73PHO || Taurasi (23) || Dupree (11) || Taylor (12) || AT&T Center  6,763
|- 
| 3:00 || Seattle || @ || Los Angeles || ESPN2 || 81-66SEA || Jackson (24) || Jackson (9) || Jackson,Cash (5) || Staples Center  8,326
|-
| rowspan=1|Sun 29 || 8:00 || New York || @ || Indiana || ESPN2 || 75-67IND || Pondexter (24) || Catchings (13) || Douglas (5) || Conseco Fieldhouse  7,535
|-
| rowspan=1|Wed 1 || 7:30 || Indiana || @ || New York || NBA TVMSG || 77-74NY || Pondexter (30) || McWilliams-Franklin (11) || Douglas,McWilliams-Franklin,MitchellPondexter (4) || Madison Square Garden  16,682
|-

|-
| rowspan=1|Thu 2 || 10:00 || Phoenix || @ || Seattle || NBA TV || 82-74SEA || Jackson (23) || Jackson (17) || Bird (10) || KeyArena  9,686
|-
| rowspan=2|Sun 5 || 3:00 || Seattle || @ || Phoenix || ABC || 91-88SEA || Taurasi (28) || Cash,Jackson,Little (8) || Johnson (12) || US Airways Center  9,010
|-
| 7:00 || Atlanta || @ || New York || NBA TVMSG || 81-75ATL || Pondexter (24) || Lyttle (13)  || Mitchell (6) || Madison Square Garden  14,248
|-
| rowspan=1|Tue 7 || 7:30 || New York || @ || Atlanta || NBA TVFSSOMSG || 105-93ATL || McCoughtry (42) || de Souza, McWilliams-Franklin (6) || Pondexter (9) || Philips Arena  9,045
|-

|-
| rowspan=1|Sun 12 || 3:00 || Atlanta || @ || Seattle || ABC || 79-77SEA || Jackson (26) || Lyttle (14) || Bird (8) || KeyArena  15,084
|-
| rowspan=1|Tue 14 || 9:00 || Atlanta || @ || Seattle || ESPN2 || 87-84SEA || Jackson (26) || Little, McCoughtry (9) || C. Miller (8) || KeyArena  13,898
|-
| rowspan=1|Thu 16 || 8:00 || Seattle || @ || Atlanta || ESPN2 || 87-84SEA || McCoughtry (35) || de Souza (14) || Bird (7) || Philips Arena  10,522
|-

Playoffs and Finals

Season award winners

Player of the Week award

Player of the Month award

Rookie of the Month award

Postseason awards

Coaches

Eastern Conference
Atlanta Dream: Marynell Meadors 
Chicago Sky: Steven Key
Connecticut Sun: Mike Thibault
Indiana Fever: Lin Dunn
New York Liberty: Anne Donovan
Washington Mystics: Julie Plank

Western Conference
Los Angeles Sparks: Jennifer Gillom 
Minnesota Lynx: Cheryl Reeve
Phoenix Mercury: Corey Gaines 
San Antonio Silver Stars: Sandy Brondello
Seattle Storm: Brian Agler
Tulsa Shock: Nolan Richardson

See also
WNBA
WNBA Draft
WNBA All-Star Game
WNBA Playoffs
WNBA Finals

References

 
2010 in American women's basketball
2010–11 in American basketball by league
2009–10 in American basketball by league
Women's National Basketball Association seasons